Hákon Rafn Valdimarsson (born 13 October 2001) is an Icelandic professional footballer who plays as a goalkeeper for Swedish club Elfsborg.

Club career

Grótta 
After playing as an outfield player for the youth sides of KR, he first played as a goalkeeper after his switch to Grótta in 2015, appearing as an outfield player for Grótta's youth sides as late as 2017. He made his senior debut in the last game of the 2017 1. deild season as an already relegated Grótta lost 2–1 to Leiknir Reykjavík. Hákon then played in 15 out of 22 games in the 2018 2. deild as Grótta placed second and were promoted back to 1. deild. In the 2019 season, Hákon played in all 22 matches as Grótta became champions and were promoted to the top tier Úrvalsdeild for the first time. In 2020 he played all 18 matches as Grótta were relegated back to the 1. deild. It was announced on 30 April 2021 that Hákon had signed with Allsvenskan team IF Elfsborg and that Hákon would join them in the summer. Hákon played 9 matches for Grótta in the first half of the 2021 season before joining Elfsborg in July.

Elfsborg 
It was announced on 30 April 2021 that Hákon had signed with Allsvenskan team IF Elfsborg and that Hákon would join them in the summer, Hákon then joined formally in July. Hákon made his Allsvenskan debut for Elfsborg in a 1–0 win against IFK Göteborg on 1 October 2021 and proceeded to play in the next four matches.

International career 
Hákon has featured for the U-18, U-19 and U-21 Iceland youth teams, debuting in 2018, 2019 and 2021 respectively. On 12 November 2021 Hákon received his first call-up to the senior squad when Patrik Gunnarsson had to withdraw through injury.

Career statistics

Honours 
Grótta
 1. deild: 2019

References

External links

2001 births
Living people
Hakon Rafn Valdimarsson
Association football goalkeepers
Hakon Rafn Valdimarsson
Hakon Rafn Valdimarsson
IF Elfsborg players
Hakon Rafn Valdimarsson
Hakon Rafn Valdimarsson
Allsvenskan players
Hakon Rafn Valdimarsson
Expatriate footballers in Sweden
Hakon Rafn Valdimarsson